Emma Bowen may refer to:
 Emma L. Bowen (died 1996), American community activist in community health care and fair media
 Emma Lucy Gates Bowen (1882–1951), American opera singer